Train control may refer to:
 In a push–pull train, control of the locomotive from either an on-board cab or a control car
 Signalling control directs the overall traffic of trains to allocate space and prevent collisions
 Train protection system controls trains to stop them in the event of human failure